Maxwell Kalu  (born 23 March 1976 in Aba) is a Nigerian retired footballer.

Successes

 1x Nigeria Premier League Winner (1996) with Udoji United F.C.
 3x Polish Cup Winner (1997/98, 1998/99, 1999/00) with Amica Wronki.

References

External links
 

1976 births
Living people
Igbo sportspeople
Nigerian footballers
Udoji United F.C. players
Amica Wronki players
Widzew Łódź players
KSZO Ostrowiec Świętokrzyski players
Mławianka Mława players
Radomiak Radom players
Odra Opole players
Tur Turek players
Association football forwards
Dolphin F.C. (Nigeria) players
People from Aba, Abia
Expatriate footballers in Poland
Nigerian expatriate sportspeople in Poland